Geoffrey William Crawford (born July 20, 1954) is the chief United States district judge of the United States District Court for the District of Vermont and former Associate Justice of the Vermont Supreme Court.

Biography
Crawford was born in 1954 in Ann Arbor, Michigan. He received a Bachelor of Arts degree, cum laude, in 1977 from Yale University. He received a Juris Doctor, cum laude, in 1980 from Harvard Law School. He began his legal career as a law clerk to Judge Albert W. Coffrin of the United States District Court for the District of Vermont from 1980 to 1981. From 1981 to 1984, he was an associate at the law firm of Burlingham, Underwood & Lord in New York City and from 1984 to 1987, he was an associate at the law firm of Manchester & O'Neill in Vermont. From 1987 to 2002, he was a partner with Jerome O'Neill at the law firm of O'Neil, Crawford & Green. He served as a judge of the Vermont Superior Court from 2002 to 2013. In 2013 he succeeded Brian L. Burgess as an associate justice of the Vermont Supreme Court, and he served until 2014.

Federal judicial service
On May 20, 2014, President Barack Obama nominated Crawford to serve as a United States District Judge of the United States District Court for the District of Vermont, to the seat being vacated by Judge William K. Sessions III, who assumed senior status on June 15, 2014. Crawford was recommended to President Obama, on March 24, 2014, by Senator Patrick J. Leahy after being evaluated by a nonpartisan Judicial Selection Commission established by Senator Leahy and Senator Bernie Sanders. A hearing on his nomination before the United States Senate Judiciary Committee was held on June 4, 2014. On June 12, 2014 his nomination was reported out of committee by a voice vote. On June 19, 2014 Senate Majority Leader Harry Reid filed a motion to invoke cloture on the nomination. On June 23, 2014 the United States Senate voted 52–32 to invoke cloture. On Tuesday June 24, 2014 the United States Senate confirmed him by a 95–0 vote. He received his judicial commission on August 4, 2014. He took the oath of office during his judicial investiture ceremony on August 12, 2014, and he maintained chambers in the United States Courthouse in Rutland, Vermont. Harold "Duke" Eaton Jr. succeed him on the Vermont Supreme Court. He became Chief Judge on December 21, 2017.

References

External links

1954 births
Living people
Harvard Law School alumni
Judges of the United States District Court for the District of Vermont
New York (state) lawyers
Politicians from Burlington, Vermont
Superior court judges in the United States
United States district court judges appointed by Barack Obama
Vermont lawyers
Justices of the Vermont Supreme Court
Yale University alumni
21st-century American judges